Elections to the Bihar Legislative Assembly were held on 25 February 1957. 1393 candidates contested for the 264 constituencies in the Assembly. There were 54 two-member constituencies and 210 single-member constituencies.

State Reorganization 
Bihar was reduced slightly by the transfer of minor territories to West Bengal in 1956 under States Reorganisation Act, 1956. Hence the constituencies were reduced from 330 in 1951 to 318 in 1957 elections.

Results 

!colspan=10|
|-
! colspan=2|Party !! Flag !! Seats  Contested !! Won !! Net change  in seats !! % of  Seats
! Votes !! Vote % !! Change in vote %
|- style="background: #90EE90;"
| 
| style="text-align:left;" |Indian National Congress
| 
| 312 || 210 ||  29 || 66.04 || 44,55,425 || 42.09 ||  0.71
|-
| 
| style="text-align:left;" |Praja Socialist Party
|
| 222 || 31 || New || 9.75 || 16,94,974 || 16.01 || New
|-
| 
|
| 125 || 23 ||  12 || 7.23 || 8,29,195 || 7.83 ||  4.67
|-
| 
|
| 71 || 31 ||  1 || 9.75 || 7,49,021 || 7.08 ||  0.93
|-
| 
| style="text-align:left;" |Communist Party of India
| 
| 60 || 7 ||  7 || 2.20 || 5,45,577 || 5.15 ||  4.01
|-
| 
|
| 572 || 16 ||  11 || 5.03 || 21,81,180 || 20.61 || N/A
|- class="unsortable" style="background-color:#E9E9E9"
! colspan = 3|
! style="text-align:center;" |Total seats !! 318 ( 12) !! style="text-align:center;" |Voters !! 2,56,21,144 !! style="text-align:center;" |Turnout !! colspan = 2|1,05,85,422 (41.32%)
|}

Elected members

By-elections 
In 1958 a by-election was held for the Dhanbad seat. The election was won by the Indian National Congress candidate R. Chaudhury, who obtained 8,998 votes. His opponent, M. Desai, received 5,792 votes.

In 1959 a by-election was held for the Nawada seat. The election was won by the Indian National Congress candidate M. Ahmad, who obtained 10,236 votes. His opponent, T. N. Yadav, received 7,474 votes.

See also 

 1957 elections in India
 1952 Bihar Legislative Assembly election
 1962 Bihar Legislative Assembly election

References 

1957
1957
Bihar